Félix Sicre (1817 – 1871) was a Cuban chess master.

He became the first Cuban champion in 1860, and lost the title in 1862 match against Celso Golmayo Zúpide. Sicre lost all games to Paul Morphy, during his two visits in Havana in October 1862 and February 1864.

References

Further reading
 Andrés Clemente Vázquez, ''La odisea de Pablo Morphy en La Habana, La Propaganda Literaria, Habana 1893.

External links
 

1817 births
1871 deaths
Cuban chess players
19th-century chess players